"No Other One" is a single by Taio Cruz, the second single from his album, Rokstarr. It was released on November 30, 2009. The song peaked at #42 on the UK Singles Chart, making it the lowest charting single from the album.

Reception
The song was awarded two stars by Digital Spy, with the full review stating: "Taio Cruz's current album, Rokstarr, kicks off with a meaty portion of club bangers before drifting somewhat disjointedly into soft rock territory more familiar to Take That and Coldplay. Those more subdued songs are perhaps being saved for a later date, but for now he's sticking - or positively clinging - to the same formula that sent 'Break Your Heart' all the way to the top in September. Lots of pop artists forge their own distinct sound of course, but 'No Other One' is verging on an outright rip-off of its predecessor. Those same Europoppy synths are out in force, there's a hefty dose of Auto-Tune on Cruz's vocals and it boasts an equally repetitive hook that's sure to get stuck in your head from about 20 seconds in. Though a perfectly enjoyable effort in its own right, it can't help feeling like a bit of a comedown after the superior thumper that came before it."

Track listing
 CD single and Digital download
 "No Other One" (Radio Edit) - 3:37
 "No Other One" (Ian Carey Remix Radio Edit) - 3:34

 Digital download - EP
 "No Other One" (Radio Edit) - 3:37
 "No Other One" (Ian Carey Remix Radio Edit) - 3:34
 "Break Your Heart" (featuring Ludacris) - 3:05

Chart performance

Release history

References

2009 singles
Taio Cruz songs
Songs written by Fraser T. Smith
Songs written by Taio Cruz
Song recordings produced by Fraser T. Smith
2009 songs
Island Records singles